Raghunath Pandit was a 17th-century Marathi poet. He was born in a Deshastha Rigvedi Brahmin (DRB) family of scholars.

Marathi poetry went through a phase where text drew heavily on religious mythology and was dominated by language influenced by Sanskrit, a language which few in contemporary times understand. This literature is called Pant-Sahitya. Raghunath Pandit was one of its major practitioners, writing the Nal-Damayanti Swayamwar Akhyan.

Other exponents of Pant-Sahitya were Vaman Pandit (1608–1695), Shridhar Pandit (1658-1729) and Moropant (Paradkar) (1729–1794). Several scholars were experts in this field around the year 1900 but slowly their numbers dwindled. Laxman Ramchand (La Raa) Pangarkar was an authority on Sant-Sahitya and Pant-Sahitya. Tukaram and Ramdas were the last major poets of Sant-Sahitya and Bhakti Parampara. The next phase of Bhakti was marked by Pant-Sahitya. Around this time, other forms of poetry such as Powada, Phatka, Lavani also existed. Starting with Keshavasut in the late 19th century, Marathi poetry made a departure from Pant parampara. It became more modern in outlook, easier to understand, expanded its horizons, and the new brigade of poets was also influenced by English poetry.

References

Marathi-language writers